Isostyla zetila is a moth of the family Notodontidae first described by Jean Baptiste Boisduval in 1870. It is found from Costa Rica north to Guatemala.

References

Moths described in 1870
Notodontidae